Wilhelmina "Willy" de Beer (later Vel, born 5 September 1942) is a retired Dutch speed skater. She competed in the 1000, 1500 and 3000 m events at the 1964 Winter Olympics with the best result of 16th place in the 1500 m.

References

External links 
 

1942 births
Living people
Dutch female speed skaters
Olympic speed skaters of the Netherlands
Speed skaters at the 1964 Winter Olympics
People from Medemblik
Sportspeople from North Holland
20th-century Dutch women
20th-century Dutch people
21st-century Dutch women